Yelizaveta Korol (née Lunina, born 2 September 1994) is a Kazakhstani sports shooter. She competed in the women's 10 metre air rifle event at the 2016 Summer Olympics.

References

External links
 

1994 births
Living people
Kazakhstani female sport shooters
Olympic shooters of Kazakhstan
Shooters at the 2016 Summer Olympics
Place of birth missing (living people)
Asian Games medalists in shooting
Shooters at the 2014 Asian Games
Medalists at the 2014 Asian Games
Asian Games bronze medalists for Kazakhstan
21st-century Kazakhstani women